The Chinese Ambassador to Brazil is the official representative of the People's Republic of China to Brazil.

List of representatives

See also
China–Brazil relations

References 

Ambassadors of China to Brazil
Brazil
China